Kenneth Johnson (October 6, 1944 – January 2005) was a political figure in New Brunswick, Canada. He represented Rogersville-Kouchibouguac in the Legislative Assembly of New Brunswick from 1995 to 1999 as a Liberal member.

He was born in Saint-Louis-de-Kent, New Brunswick and educated at Dalhousie University and the University of Moncton. Johnson was a municipal administrator in Saint-Louis-de-Kent. He also served as president and director for the local Caisse-Populaire. Johnson died at the age of 60, apparently from injuries sustained after losing control of his snowmobile

References 
 Canadian Parliamentary Guide, 1997, Kathryn O'Handley 

1944 births
2005 deaths
New Brunswick Liberal Association MLAs